Myristyl aldehyde, also known as tetradecanal, is a reduced form of myristic acid.

It is naturally produced by bioluminescent bacteria of the Vibrio genus and is one of two substrates produced and consumed by the Vibrio fischeri luciferase light emission system.

References

Fatty aldehydes
Alkanals